Tomb TT374, located in the necropolis of El-Khokha in Thebes, Egypt, is the tomb of the Scribe of the Treasury of the Ramesseum, Amenemope.

The tomb was dug into the side of the courtyard of TT188, the tomb of Parennefer. The deceased is shown before Osiris and Ra. Porter and Moss identify the god as Re-Harakhti.

See also
 List of Theban tombs

References

Buildings and structures completed in the 14th century BC
Buildings and structures of the Eighteenth Dynasty of Egypt
Theban tombs